The Old Dominion Monarchs baseball team is a varsity intercollegiate athletic team of Old Dominion University in Norfolk, Virginia, United States. The team is a member of the Sun Belt Conference, which is part of NCAA Division I. Old Dominion's first baseball team was fielded in 1931 as the William and Mary College – Norfolk Division Braves. ODU joined Division I in 1977. The team plays its home games at Bud Metheny Baseball Complex in Norfolk, Virginia where it has played since 1982. ODU has won 6 conference tournament titles and have been to the NCAA Tournament nine times. The Monarchs are coached by  Chris Finwood, a native of Hampton, Virginia who is in his eleventh year at the helm. The Monarchs have had eleven players reach the Major Leagues and two, Justin Verlander and Daniel Hudson, have played in the World Series.

History

Division II: pre-Metheny era
Old Dominion University was founded in 1930 as the College of William and Mary Norfolk Division. The then named Braves played their first season of baseball in 1931 under head coach Tommy Scott. Scott coached the Braves for nine seasons before retiring in 1939 after compiling an overall record of 50-62-2. After Scott the Braves were coached by several coaches who mostly only coached for one season, the most successful of which coached for three seasons and won a total of 5 games.

Bud Metheny era

In 1948 former New York Yankee outfielder Arthur "Bud" Metheny became the head coach of the Braves. In 1962 the school became Old Dominion College before attaining university status in 1969 when they changed the name to the Monarchs. Their first post season appearance and title came in 1963 in the Mason Dixon conference playoffs where they defeated Loyola two games to one. While playing in the NCAA's Division II Old Dominion won 6 titles; two Tidewater Scholastic championships in 1932 & 1934, four Little Eight championships in 1958 & 1961-63, and four Mason-Dixon Conference championships in 1963, 1964, 1965, and 1968. In 1963 & 1964 the Monarchs won the NCAA College Division Eastern Championship before losing in the championship in 1965. During the 1969–1970 season the Monarchs were coached by Jim Bradly and went on to a 12-14 record, after which Metheny returned to the team for the next 10 years. In 1971 & 1972 ODU finished as NCAA Division II South Atlantic finalists. He also led the transition for the Baseball Monarchs to NCAA Division I in 1977. Metheny left coaching the Monarchs in 1980 after winning his last title, the Virginia Intercollegiate State Championship over UVA. Metheny is ODU's all-time career wins leader with 423 wins in 31 years.

Mark Newman era
Mark Newman took over after Metheny in 1981 when the team left the Mason Dixon Conference for the ECAC South, which would later become the Colonial Athletic Association in 1985. In Newman's second season  the Monarchs earned a bid to the 1982 NCAA Tournament where they won their first game against the ECAC South champion ECU Pirates. In 1983 the Monarchs left the ECAC for the Sun Belt Conference. During the 1985 season the Monarchs set several school recording including overall wins with a record of 50-11, the schools only 50 win season, and a Sun Belt Championship. The 1985 Monarchs earned a berth in the 1985 NCAA Tournament and during the season achieved their highest ranking in school history, appearing at 7th in the polls. Newman coached the Monarchs from 1981–1989 when he left to become New York Yankees coordinator of minor league instruction.

The CAA years
In 1990 the Monarchs were taken over by Pat McMahon who in his first year led the team to the 1990 NCAA Tournament. The Monarchs then transitioned to the Colonial Athletic Association in 1992. McMahon again led the Monarchs to the NCAA tournament in 1994 after winning the CAA tournament. Both times McMahon led the Monarchs to the NCAA tournament he had 40 win seasons. McMahon left ODU after the 1994 season to become the Associate Head Coach at Mississippi State. Tony Guzzo was hired from VCU in 1995 after McMahon left ODU and led the Monarchs to back-to-back CAA titles and NCAA Tournaments in his first two seasons at the helm. Between Coach McMahon and Coach Guzzo the Monarchs had the 21st best winning percentage (.660) in the NCAA during the 1990s tied with Texas and ahead of teams like USC and Mississippi State. In 2000 Guzzo again led his team to the post season earning an at-large bid to the 2000 NCAA Tournament. Guzzo coached the Monarchs until 2005 when Jerry Meyers took over. Meyers coached the Monarchs from 2005–2010 when he returned to South Carolina. Meyers' career at ODU was highlighted by a victory over #2 UNC, the school's lone victory over a top 5 team until 2014. The 2011 ODU Monarchs were coached by interim head coach Nate Goulet who was named CAA Coach of the Year and led the team to an appearance in the CAA Championship game.

Chris Finwood era
In 2012 Old Dominion hired Chris Finwood as their head coach. Finwood came to ODU from Western Kentucky where he led the Hilltoppers to two conference titles and NCAA tournament appearances. His first season resulted in 19 wins and last place in the CAA. Finwood led the Monarchs from the CAA to Conference USA in 2014 and made them instantly competitive in their new league. The 2013 team was ineligible for the CAA tournament because of this planned move and went on to win 30 games and finished in 3rd place in the conference. Finwood's third team at ODU continued to improve on the previous year by winning six more games than the 2013 team. On April 29, 2014 the Monarchs defeated the #1 ranked team and eventual College World Series Runner-Up Virginia by a score of 8-1 at Harbor Park in Norfolk, Virginia. The victory was ODU and Finwood's first ever victory over the #1 team in the country. The season concluded after a deep run in the conference tournament earned them a bid to the 2014 NCAA Tournament where they went 0-2. In just three years Finwood led the Monarchs from last place in the CAA to back-to-back 30-win seasons, and earned an at-large bid to the NCAA tournament as a three seed in the Columbia, South Carolina Regional. In 6 seasons he has won 30+ games at the helm of ODU's program.

In 2015 ODU swept nationally ranked UVA making it three straight over the Cavaliers, two of those wins when UVA was ranked #1. Finwood has currently led his team to 27+ wins in three of his four seasons at ODU after a 19 win campaign in his first season and two straight C-USA Conference Tournament berths. Despite a 30 win season and 15-12 in conference, ODU was ineligible for 2013 CAA Conference Tournament but would have been the third seed.

Coaching records
Records are through the beginning of the 2018 season
Records taken from the Old Dominion baseball media guide.
No team played baseball for ODU during the 1939–1940 and 1944–1945 seasons.

Pre-Division I

Division I

Year by year results
Since joining Division I – 1977

Note: W = Wins, L = Losses, T = Ties, CW = Conference Wins, CL = Conference Losses

Monarchs in the NCAA tournament

NCAA Tournament Game-by-Game Results

NCAA All Tournament Team

1994 East Regional 
Kevin Gibbs OF
1995 Atlantic I Regional 
Ray Russin DH
Maika Symmonds OF

2000 Clemson Regional 
Tim Hummel SS
2014 Columbia Regional
Tyler Urps SS

Rivalries
Records through of 2015 season

East Carolina University
ODU and ECU were longtime opponents in the CAA before ECU's move to the C-USA. When ODU announced it was moving to the C-USA in 2014 it was expected to add to the already heated rivalry but they were only together in the C-USA for one year due to ECU's move to the American Athletic Conference. ECU and ODU are yearly opponents regardless of conference affiliation and ECU leads the all-time series 44-34.

University of Virginia
ODU and UVA have played very competitively over the course of their history. With the hiring of head coach Brian O'Connor and the resurgence of Cavalier baseball during his tenure the Cavaliers have won most of the games in the past decade. UVA and ODU have scheduled home-and-home series at Davenport Field in Charlottesville and Harbor Park in Norfolk. ODU upset then #1 UVA at Harbor Park in 2014 and #1 UVA in Charlottesville in 2015 for the programs only wins over a top ranked team in school history. ODU leads the all-time series 33-24-2 and is currently on a three-game winning streak.

Virginia Commonwealth University
VCU was one of Old Dominion's largest rivalries from its time in the CAA. ODU & VCU games are among the highest attended games on their schedule and they play at least one game against each other every season. Former Monarch Paul Keyes was the head coach at VCU from 1995 until his death in 2012. In honor of Coach Keyes the two teams began a charity game in his name where they raise money for cancer research during a game played at War Memorial Stadium in Hampton, Virginia. The Paul A Keyes Hitting Facility at the Bud Metheny Baseball Complex which opened in Fall 2014 was also named in Coach Keyes' honor. ODU leads the all-time series 87-61.

All-Time Record vs C-USA
UTEP, and North Texas do not field baseball teams.
Records include games prior to ODU joining C-USA in 2014.
Records are current until the end of 2016 season.

ODU vs Top 10 Teams
Old Dominion is 7-5 all-time in match-ups against Top 10 ranked teams.

#1
2014 at Virginia – L 1-7
2014 Virginia – W 8-1(at Harbor Park)
2015 at Virginia – W 14-5

#2
2008 at North Carolina –  W 8-6

#5
2009 at North Carolina – L 6-7

#8
1998 South Carolina W 15-10
2003 NC State L 1-3
2015 Rice W/W/L 12-4, 9-8, 4-5

#10
2001 South Carolina – L 3-16
2016 NC State W  5-0

Award winners

Conference awards
All awards come from the ODU sports baseball record book.
Awards are first team unless otherwise noted.
The Monarchs have had 152 All-Conference Selections, 133 since joining Division I. By conference there have been 19 All Mason Dixon(D-II), 6 All-ECAC South, 41 All-Sun Belt, 72 All-CAA, and 14 All-Conference USA selections.
The ODU record for most All-Conference selections is 8 in 1985, ODU's only 50 win season and Sun Belt Tournament championship season.

Conference Player of the Year
Sun Belt
1986 Todd Azar
CAA
1994 Kevin Gibbs
1997 Ron Walker
2000 Tim Hummel
2011 Kyle Hald

Conference Tournament MVP
Sun Belt
1986 Todd Azar
CAA
1994 Matt Quatraro
1995 Maika Symmonds 
1996 Ron Walker

Conference Freshman of the Year
Sun Belt
1990 Stephen Lyons
1991 T.J. O’Donnell
CAA
1994 Brett Wheeler
1995 Ron Walker
1998 Tim Hummel
2002 Justin Verlander
2009 Brett Harris

Conference Newcomer of the Year
C-USA
2017 Jared Young

Conference Defensive Player of the Year
C-USA
2017 Zach Rutherford

Conference Coach of the Year
Sun Belt
1985 Mark Newman
1987 Mark Newman 
1990 Pat McMahon 
CAA
1994 Pat McMahon 
1996 Tony Guzzo 
2006 Jerry Meyers
2011 Nate Goulet

National honors

Old Dominion has had six players selected as D-I First Team All-Americans and two selected as D-II First Team All-Americans with one selected twice. Nine Monarchs have been named First Team Freshman All-Americans. Thirty-nine Monarch players have been named to the ABCA All-Region Team.

All Americans
1963 Bob Walton – 1st Team Div II
1963 Jim Zadell – 2nd Team Div II
1964 Fred Kovner – 1st Team Div II
1964 Bob Walton – 2nd Team Div II
1965 Fred Kovner – 1st Team Div II
1982 Mark Wasinger – 1st Team C & SN
1983 Terry Bell – 1st Team SN
1985 Kevin Bearse – 3rd Team BA
1985 Todd Azar – 3rd Team C
1986 Todd Azar – 1st Team BA
1990 George Sells – 1st Team CB
1991 Jeff Ware – 3rd Team C
1994 Kevin Gibbs – 3rd Team CB & BA
1995 Kevin Gibbs – 3rd Team CB
1996 Matt Quatraro – 2nd Team C, 3rd Team CB
2000 Tim Hummel – 1st Team CB & BA, 2nd Team BW
2007 Anthony Shawler – 1st Team CB, 2nd Team C, 3rd Team BA
2013 Ben Verlander – 3rd Team BW
2017 Jared Young - 3rd Team CB, 3rd Team C, Honorable Mention PG
2017 Zach Rutherford - 3rd Team C

Freshman All Americans
1985 Wiley Lee – 1st Team CB
1990 Stephen Lyons – 2nd Team CB
1991 Wayne Gomes  – 1st Team CB
1993 Kevin Gibbs – 1st Team CB & BA
1994 Brett Wheeler  – 1st Team CB
1995 Ron Walker – Hon Mention CB
1997 Shawn Pearson – Hon Mention CB
1998 Tim Hummel – 1st Team CB & BA
2000 Brent Sollenberger – Hon Mention CB
2001 Matt Moye – Hon Mention CB
2002 Justin Verlander – 1st Team CB & BA
2006 Dan Hudson – Hon Mention CB
2009 Brett Harris – 1st Team CB
2011 Joey Burney – 1st Team CB
2014 Nick Walker – 1st Team CB
2015 Zach Rutherford – 1st Team CB, 2nd Team BA
2017 Kyle Battle - CB
2017 John Wilson - CB
2017 Vinnie Pasquantino - CB

C – Coaches, CB – Collegiate Baseball/Louisville Slugger, BA – Baseball America, BW – Baseball Writers, SN – Sporting News, PG - Perfect Game/Rawlings

ABCA All Region

1981 John Micheltree 
1981 Mark Wasinger 
1982 Mark Wasinger
1982 Tony Morris 
1983 Terry Bell
1985 Todd Azar 
1985 Tommy West 
1985 Kevin Bearse
1987 Todd Azar 
1991 Jeff Ware 
1994 Kevin Gibbs 
1996 John O’Reilly
1996 Matt Quatraro
1996 Brian Fiumara 
1996 Ron Walker
1997 Jesse James
1997 Tony Gsell
1997 Ron Walker 
1998 Shawn Pearson

1999 Tony Gsell 
1999 Tim Hummel
1999 Andy Lee 
2000 Jared Musolf 
2000 Tim Hummel
2002 Justin Verlander 
2004 Justin Verlander 
2006 Jason Godin
2006 Dana Arrowood 
2006 Patrick Nichols 
2006 Jimmy Miles
2007 Anthony Shawler 
2007 Mike Zahm
2007 David Burns 
2009 Jake McAloose
2011 Kyle Hald 
2013 Ben Verlander
2014 Brad Gero
2017 Jared Young
2017 Zach Rutherford

Regional Coach of the Year
1963 Bud Metheny
2014 Chris Finwood

MLB Monarch Award winners

MVP
Justin Verlander – 2011 AL

Cy Young Award
Justin Verlander – 2011 AL

Rookie of the Year
Justin Verlander – 2006 AL

Silver Slugger Award
Daniel Hudson – 2011 NL

Notable players

Major Leaguers
 Kevin Bearse (1990)
 Terry Bell (1986–87)
 Wayne Gomes (1997–2002)
 Daniel Hudson (2009–present)
 Tim Hummel (2003–04)
 Paul Mitchell (1975–80)
 John Montague (1973–80)
 Dennis Riddleberger (1960–72)
 Justin Verlander (2005–present)
 Jeff Ware (1995–96)
 Mark Wasinger (1986–88)
 Ryan Yarbrough (2018–present)

On Team USA
  Justin Verlander 2003
 Kevin Gibbs 1994
 Jeff Ware 1991
 Wiley Lee 1986
 Todd Azar 1986
 Paul Mitchell 1971

Old Dominion has produced five first round draft picks in the MLB Draft with the highest selection being Justin Verlander at number 2 overall by Detroit in 2004. ODU baseball players have been selected 73 times in the MLB Draft.

Retired numbers
The ODU Baseball Monarchs have retired two jerseys in their history. The jersey number 3 was retired former New York Yankee outfielder and ODU Baseball Head Coach Bud Metheny who compiled an overall record of 423–363–6 during his 31 years at ODU and was induced into the American Association of College Baseball Coaches Hall of Fame in 1984 and the ODU Hall of Fame in 1982. While playing for the Yankees Metheny won the 1943 World Series. Coach Metheny was named the East Region National Coach of the Year in 1963 and the Bud Metheny Baseball Complex where ODU currently plays was named for him.

The second jersey is number 35 for current Houston Astros pitcher Justin Verlander. Verlander was the second overall pick in the 2004 MLB draft. He was induced into the ODU Hall of Fame in 2012 and holds the ODU, Virginia, and Colonial Athletic Association all-time record for career strikeouts and earning Freshman All-American honors. As of 2014 Justin Verlander is the only former Monarch to have played in the World Series pitching in two for Detroit in 2006 and 2012. In 2006 as a rookie Verlander pitched in games 1 and 5 against the Cardinals going 0–2. In the 2012 series Verlander pitched game 1 taking the loss as the Giants swept the Tigers in four games for the championship. Verlander won the AL Rookie of the Year in 2006 when he went to his first World Series and has also won the 2011 AL MVP and Cy Young Award. He has also pitched two no hitters in his career, once on June 12, 2007 against Milwaukee and again on May 7, 2011 against Toronto.

Bud Metheny Baseball Complex

The Monarchs have played at the Bud Metheny Baseball Complex since it opened in 1983. The complex has a total capacity of 2,500 people with the stadium record being 2,125 on the day of its dedication. The facilities contain coaches offices beneath the first base bleachers and the player locker room beneath the third base bleachers. In 2009 the field obtained a new video board and in 2011 a batter's eye was erected. The facility also has a beer garden in the first baseline foul area, an all turf halo behind home plate, a turf stretching/bunting area, and the Paul Keyes Indoor Hitting Facility.

See also
 List of NCAA Division I baseball programs
 Old Dominion Monarchs

References

External links

 

 
Baseball teams established in 1931
1931 establishments in Virginia